The National Museum of Pakistan is located in Karachi, Pakistan.

History
The National Museum of Pakistan was established in Frere Hall on 17 April 1950, replacing the defunct Victoria Museum. Frere Hall itself was built in 1865 as a tribute to Sir Bartle Frere, a commissioner of Sind during the 19th century. Once the museum was inaugurated the government of Pakistan deemed it wise to constitute an Advisory Council in 1950 with a primary duty to counsel the museum on the issues of enriching its collection through new acquisitions and purchase of antiquities and works of arts. The museum was shifted to the present premises (located in Burns Garden, Dr. Zia-ud-din Ahmed Road) in 1970.

Galleries

In 1970 there were only four galleries in the museum. Over time the museum grew, with the building currently housing a total of eleven galleries including a “Quran Gallery”. The National Museum has more than 300 copies of the Quran, out of which around 52 rare manuscripts are on display. The museum also contains an important collection of items relating to Pakistan's cultural heritage. Some other galleries display Indus civilization artifacts, Gandhara civilization sculptures, Islamic art, miniature paintings, ancient coins and manuscripts documenting Pakistan's political history. There is also an Ethnological Gallery with life size statues of different ethnicities living in the four provinces of modern-day Pakistan.

The museum has a collection of seals and statues found at the Mohenjo-daro site. The statues include the so-called Priest-King, terracotta toys and many stamp seals. It also shows some ancient coins found in those Hijri and some belongings of the national heroes of Pakistan: Quaid-e-Azam's pen, cuffs, and sword; Allama Iqbal's personal chair and pen; and Liaqat Ali Khan's personal itar bottle, watch and walking stick. There are galleries that show the clothing Muslims used to make, pottery work done by people, glasses made by Muslims, and the apparatus that was used.

Collection
The museum has a collection of 58,000 old coins (some dating from 74 Al-Hijra), and hundreds of well-preserved sculptures. Some 70,000 publications, books and other reading material of the Archeology and Museums Department were also shifted to the National Museum so that general public could see them. Every year National Museum holds around a dozen exhibitions on National Days and other occasions.

Facilities
For the preservation of the collection, a conservation laboratory is also a part of the museum. There is an auditorium on the museum premises with a 250 seating capacity.

See also
 Brahma from Mirpur-Khas
List of museums in Pakistan

References

External links

National Museum of Karachi
The National Museum of Pakistan
Report of Daily Dawn on National Museum

1950 establishments in Pakistan
Pakistan
Museums in Karachi
Pakistan federal departments and agencies
Auditoriums in Pakistan
Museums in Pakistan